Shortandy (Şortandy), is a village in northern-central Kazakhstan. It is the seat of Shortandy District in Aqmola Region.

References

Populated places in Akmola Region